Leonid Iovich Gaidai (30 January 1923 – 19 November 1993) was a Soviet and Russian comedy film director, screenwriter and actor who enjoyed immense popularity and broad public recognition in the former Soviet Union. His films broke theatre attendance records and were some of the top-selling DVDs in Russia. He has been described as "the king of Soviet comedy".

Early life and first success
Gaidai was born on 30 January 1923 in Svobodny, Amur Oblast, where he is commemorated by a statue. His father Iov Isidorovich Gaidai came from a Ukrainian family of serfs of the Poltava Governorate. At the age of 22 he was sentenced to several years of katorga for revolutionary activity and sent to the Far East to work at the railway. Leonid's mother Maria Ivanovna Lubimova was born in the Ryazan Oblast to Russian parents. She met her Iove through her brother Egor, also a katorga worker who sent her a photo of his friend along with a marriage proposal. After Gaidai's term expired, they settled down in the Amur Oblast where Gaidai continued working at the railway building site.

Leonid was the third child in the family. His elder brother Aleksandr (1919–1994) was a well-known poet and a war correspondent. Leonid took part in amateur dramatics from a young age. He graduated from school on 20 June 1941. Just two days after, the Great Patriotic War started.

In February 1942, he was enrolled in the Red Army. He first served in Mongolia, then finished sergeant courses, becoming a squad leader. He worked in the military intelligence. On 20 December 1942, Gaidai was awarded the Medal "For Battle Merit" for killing three Nazi soldiers and taking hostages during the battle for Yenkino village. On 20 March 1943, he was heavily injured after stepping on a land mine. He spent nine months in military hospitals. In January 1944, he was sent home as war-disabled. In 1945, he joined the Communist Party.

Gaidai studied at the Irkutsk District Drama Theatre's studio school, and after graduating in 1947 acted in theatre productions. He subsequently attended the Moscow Institute of Cinematography, Grigori Aleksandrov workshop, completing his studies in 1955. He married the actress Nina Grebeshkova, who played minor roles in his future films. He initially worked as an assistant to director Boris Barnet on the 1955 film Lyana, before directing the first of his own films in 1956 (the historical drama A Weary Road). His 1958 comedy The Dead Affair was described by Minister of Culture Nikolai Mikhailov as "a lampooning of Soviet Reality" and was cut to 47 minutes by censors as a result, and released as A Groom from the Other World. He subsequently avoided overtly political themes.

His first success came six years after graduation, with a segment of the short film collection Absolutely Seriously (1961), which instantly became highly popular. In this film, Gaidai first introduced a comic trio of crooks – Georgy Vitsin, Yuri Nikulin, and Yevgeny Morgunov (aka 'ViNiMor', playing the characters Coward, Fool, and Pro), who later appeared in several of his other films. After his characters and directing style won the public's love, his name gained massive selling power in USSR's cinemas.

Genre brilliance
Between 1961 and 1975, Gaidai directed a number of top-selling films, each one a huge financial success and becoming wildly popular in the Soviet Union. During these years, he filmed new adventures of the mischievous trio in Bootleggers (1961), a film adaptation of O. Henry's short stories, Strictly Business (1962), Operation Y and Shurik's Other Adventures (1965), and Kidnapping, Caucasian Style (1966). Following his break with Morgunov, Gaidai disbanded the trio, while casting Nikulin in what was to become the most popular Soviet comedy ever made, The Diamond Arm (1968).

In the 1970s, Gaidai worked primarily with the comedians from his own studio group, which included Vitsin, Kuravlyov, Pugovkin, Kramarov, Seleznyova, Krachkovskaya, and his wife Nina Grebeshkova. All this cast was featured in his film adaptation of Mikhail Zoshchenko's short stories, It Can't Be! (1975). He also filmed a play by Mikhail Bulgakov, Ivan Vasilievich: Back to the Future (1973), Ilf and Petrov's The Twelve Chairs (1971), Nikolai Gogol's Incognito from St. Petersburg (1977), and Borrowing Matchsticks (1980), a story by the Finnish author Maiju Lassila.

Commercial success
Gaidai's top-grossing film The Diamond Arm sold 76.7 million tickets in the Soviet Union alone, becoming the third highest-grossing Soviet film. At $8 per ticket (regular fare in an American movie theatre in 2005), it would have generated revenue comparable to the US box office champion Titanic. In a 1995 survey by RTR, it was voted the best comedy ever made. It was followed closely by Gaidai's other comedy films — Kidnapping, Caucasian Style (fourth place with 76.5 million viewers), Operation Y and Other Shurik's Adventures (seventh place with 69.6 million viewers) and Ivan Vasilievich: Back to the Future (17th place with 60.7 million viewers).

Later years
After 1975, Gaidai went into a period of significant decline; his only other notable work was a joint Soviet-Finnish film Borrowing Matchsticks, completed in 1980. After the collapse of the Soviet Union, he directed only one more film, capitalizing on the early perestroika business activities and starring Dmitry Kharatyan. Gaidai has a cameo in the final one, There's Good Weather in Deribasovskaya, where he plays an old gambler who tries to beat the one-armed bandit. In real life, Gaidai was addicted to gambling. These proved the most popular of his works filmed after 1975 but lacked the success of his earlier work. Gaidai was made a People's Artist of the RSFSR in 1974, People's Artist of the USSR in 1989, and died in Moscow on 19 November 1993. He was buried at the Kuntsevo Cemetery.

Style
Gaidai's comedies have a very visual style of comedy, utilizing slapstick and physical humor, with dialogue that has been described as "pithy, aphoristic, or nonsensical". He was a master of fast-paced comedy, his style and rhythm somewhat similar to Stanley Kramer's It's a Mad, Mad, Mad, Mad World. While his films on the surface portray socialist ideals, there are subversive elements and satire. He continued to suffer interference from censors, and said of his films "We will use the means of satire to fight the flaws which still sometimes hinder the lives of Soviet people".

Assessment
Gaidai remains most famous for the outstanding string of comedies he directed between 1961 and 1975, when nine of the ten films he made became Russian classics, selling between 20 and 76 million film tickets each, and becoming box office champions for several years in a row. He is less known outside of the former Soviet Union, due to the specific nature of his comedies, intrinsically tied to Soviet culture and lifestyle – unlike the motives of the characters of Kramer's "Mad World" being easily understood by the Russian public, living in the highly materialistic world of late Soviet Union. Gaidai's international recognition included a nomination for best short film at the 1961 Cannes Film Festival for Dog Barbos and Unusual Cross. and the Grand Prix Wawel Silver Dragon at the Kraków Film Festival (Poland) in 1965 for the segment "Déjà vu" in the film Operation Y and Shurik's Other Adventures.

Filmography

References

External links
 
 
 Maestro of Russian Comedy: Leonid Gaidai
 Islands. Leonid Gaidai documentary on Russia-K, 2002 (in Russian)
 Legends of the World Cinema. Leonid Gaidai documentary on Russia-K, 2011 (in Russian)
 Big Family. Leonid Gaidai talk show on Russia-K, 2013 (in Russian)

1923 births
1993 deaths
20th-century Russian male actors
20th-century Russian screenwriters
People from Svobodny, Amur Oblast
Communist Party of the Soviet Union members
Gerasimov Institute of Cinematography alumni
People's Artists of the RSFSR
People's Artists of the USSR
Recipients of the Order of Friendship of Peoples
Recipients of the Vasilyev Brothers State Prize of the RSFSR
Comedy film directors
Russian people of Ukrainian descent
Male screenwriters
Russian film directors
Russian male film actors
Russian screenwriters
Soviet film directors
Soviet male film actors
Soviet military personnel of World War II
Soviet screenwriters
World War II spies for the Soviet Union
Deaths from pulmonary embolism
Burials at Kuntsevo Cemetery